Jonathan Dasnières de Veigy was the defending champion but decided to participate at the 2013 Tennis Napoli Cup instead.
Jiří Veselý won the final by defeating Steve Darcis 6–4, 6–4 in the final.

Seeds

Draw

Finals

Top half

Bottom half

References
 Main Draw
 Qualifying Draw

Prosperita Openandnbsp;- Singles
2013 Singles